Hellesylt is a small village in Stranda Municipality in Møre og Romsdal county, Norway.   The village lies at the head of the Sunnylvsfjorden, which is a branch of the Storfjorden, and which the more famous Geirangerfjorden in turn branches off nearby. 

There are several hundred other people living in the surrounding valley area as well.

In the summertime, thousands of tourists travel through or stay in Hellesylt each day. Most of them take the ferry to the nearby village of Geiranger, which in high season runs every one and a half hours.  There is also a cruise ship pier that can handle very large ships.  The village is surrounded by mountains and valleys.  The Sunnylven Church is located in Hellesylt, which was the administrative center of the former municipality of Sunnylven.

Hellesylt is under constant threat from the mountain Åkerneset, which is about to erode into the Sunnylvsfjord. A collapse could cause a tsunami destroying most of downtown Hellesylt.

In popular culture 
The 1991 Icelandic film The White Viking was shot in Hellesylt. 
Released in March 2016, "The Wave (Bølgen)" is a Norwegian disaster movie based on the premise of a rock slide from the mountain Åkerneset.
The fictional city of Kattegat in the tv-series Vikings used Hellesynt as the backdrop. The series is shot in Wicklow, Ireland and digitally inserted Hellesynt in the background.

References

External links
Hellesylt Info

Villages in Møre og Romsdal
Stranda